Stephopoma roseum is a species of sea snail, a marine gastropod mollusc in the family Siliquariidae, the slit worm snails.

References

 Powell A. W. B., New Zealand Mollusca, William Collins Publishers Ltd, Auckland, New Zealand 1979

External links
  Spencer H.G., Willan R.C., Marshall B.A. & Murray T.J. (2011) Checklist of the Recent Mollusca Recorded from the New Zealand Exclusive Economic Zone

Siliquariidae
Gastropods of New Zealand
Gastropods described in 1834